Chaubardia is a genus of flowering plants from the orchid family, Orchidaceae. It contains 3 recognized species, all endemic to South America.

Chaubardia heteroclita (Poepp. & Endl.) Dodson & D.E.Benn. - Ecuador, Peru, Bolivia
Chaubardia klugii (C.Schweinf.) Garay - Ecuador, Peru, Bolivia, Brazil, Colombia
Chaubardia surinamensis Rchb.f. - Ecuador, Peru, Bolivia, Brazil, Colombia, Venezuela, Guyana, Suriname, French Guiana

See also 
 List of Orchidaceae genera

References 

 Pridgeon, A.M., Cribb, P.J., Chase, M.A. & Rasmussen, F. eds. (1999). Genera Orchidacearum 1. Oxford Univ. Press.
 Pridgeon, A.M., Cribb, P.J., Chase, M.A. & Rasmussen, F. eds. (2001). Genera Orchidacearum 2. Oxford Univ. Press.
 Pridgeon, A.M., Cribb, P.J., Chase, M.A. & Rasmussen, F. eds. (2003). Genera Orchidacearum 3. Oxford Univ. Press
 Berg Pana, H. 2005. Handbuch der Orchideen-Namen. Dictionary of Orchid Names. Dizionario dei nomi delle orchidee. Ulmer, Stuttgart

External links 

Orchids of South America
Zygopetalinae genera
Zygopetalinae